This page provides the summaries of the OFC Third Round matches for 1998 FIFA World Cup qualification.

Format
In this round the two winning teams from the Second Round were drawn into two home-and-away ties.

The winners advanced to the AFC–OFC play-off.

Matches

 

Australia won 5–0 on aggregate and advanced to the AFC–OFC play-off.

External links

3
1998
1998
1997 in Australian soccer
1997 in New Zealand association football